Waterford Castle is a historic house on Little Island in Waterford, Ireland.  The house was owned by a branch of the Fitzgerald family for hundreds of years, but was developed into a hotel in the 1980s.

Earlier castle

The original Fitzgerald castle was probably a tower-house or fortified house and was described as a square building with battlements erected in the 16th century, with a pointed doorway and a window flanked by a stone head.  The branch of the Fitzgerald family that owned Waterford Castle were the descendants of Patrick Fitzgerald, son of the de jure 6th Earl of Kildare.

Current house
The current castle is a Gothic-style house built in 1895 for Gerald Purcell-Fitzgerald (1865-1946) which incorporates the fabric of an earlier (pre-1845) house, and parts of the medieval (pre-1645) tower-house.  The designs were prepared by Romayne Walker and supervised by Albert Murrary (1849 - 1924). The construction is in unrefined rubble stone with fine cut-stone quoins and window frames and topped with Irish-style battlements.

References

External links
 Entry on the National Inventory of Architectural Heritage

County Waterford
Historic Houses in County Waterford